Rybár (feminine: Rybárová) is the Slovak surname literally meaning "fisherman". The Czech-language equivalent is Rybář.

Notable people with this surname include:
Patrik Rybár (born 1993), Slovak ice hockey goaltender
Pavol Rybár (born 1971), Slovak ice hockey goaltender
Valerian Rybar (1919–1990), American interior designer

See also
 

Occupational surnames
Slovak-language surnames